Sirena Irwin is an American voice director, casting director, and actress. Her career in animation casting and directing began in 2017 after a career as an actress in animation and a two-year mentorship with animation director, Andrea Romano. Her voice directing credits include the DreamWorks Animation series Jurassic World: Camp Cretaceous, the Nickelodeon series Baby Shark's Big Show! and the Cartoon Network series Apple & Onion. She got her B.A. from San Francisco State University in 1993.

As an actress, Irwin has voiced characters for animated series including the Nickelodeon television series SpongeBob SquarePants, its spinoff series Kamp Koral: SpongeBob's Under Years, Warner Bros. television series Batman: The Brave and the Bold, and DreamWorks Animation television series The Mighty Ones. She won a Broadway World Award for Best Actor in a Touring Production for her role as Lucy Ricardo in "I Love Lucy: Live on Stage".

Irwin founded Oh, Zeus!.

Filmography

Television

Film

Video games

Crew

References

External links 
 
sirenairwin.com (acting/directing site)
Oh, Zeus! (production company site)

American voice actresses
Living people
21st-century American actresses
Northfield Mount Hermon School alumni
Year of birth missing (living people)